is a horizontally scrolling shooter released in arcades by Namco in 1986. It is the sequel to Sky Kid, which was released in the previous year. It was the first game to run on the company's System 86 hardware. It was also the first game from the company to use a Yamaha YM2151 FM sound chip for its music. The gameplay is more difficult than the original, and it also introduces several new enemies and missions.

The game was re-released in the Japan-only Namco Collection for Microsoft Windows and received its first ever worldwide port to a console as part of Namco Museum Virtual Arcade for the Xbox 360, but did not include the second player's character Blue Max. Announced on February 16, 2023, the game was released on March 2, 2023 under the name Sky Kid DX, for the Nintendo Switch, as part of the Arcade Archives series by Hamster Corporation (a company that purchased a catalog of games by Nihon Bussan, UPL, NMK, Video System, and Allumer).

Differences from the original
 As mentioned above, Sky Kid Deluxe used the enhanced System 86 hardware (the original ran on the older Namco Pac-Land hardware) which allowed for greater variety in simultaneous colors (its palette is twice the size as that of the original; 512 as opposed to 256).
 The color of the sky is no longer only light blue for the whole game, but a range of different colors, including blues, grays and reds.
 Four new missions (numbered X1 to X4) have been inserted between the twenty-one original missions, for a total of twenty-five missions.
 Snow falls from the top of the screen (only in missions X1 and X3), which scrolls with the two Sky Kids as they are flying to the left.
 Several new enemies and mission targets have been introduced (one of whom, known as the "Kaminari Kid", cannot be killed by any means).
 Instead of only one background song produced by a Namco CUS30, Deluxe has two songs (produced by the aforementioned Yamaha YM2151).

Reception 
In Japan, Game Machine listed Sky Kid Deluxe on their May 1, 1986 issue as being the twenty-third most-successful table arcade unit of the month.

References

External links
 
 Sky Kid Deluxe at the Arcade History database

1986 video games
Arcade video games
Windows games
Xbox 360 games
Namco arcade games
Nintendo Switch games
PlayStation 4 games
Horizontally scrolling shooters
Video games developed in Japan

Hamster Corporation games